Library of the Printed Web is a physical archive devoted to web-to-print artists’ books, zines and other printout matter. Founded by Paul Soulellis in 2013, the collection was acquired by The Museum of Modern Art Library in January 2017. The project has been described as "web culture articulated as printed artifact," an "archive of archives," characterized as an "accumulation of accumulations," much of it printed on demand. Techniques for appropriating web content used by artists in the collection include grabbing, hunting, scraping and performing, detailed by Soulellis in "Search, Compile, Publish," and later referenced by Alessandro Ludovico.

Among the 130 artists included in Library of the Printed Web are Olia Lialina, Mishka Henner, Clement Valla, Karolis Kosas, Lauren Thorson, Cory Arcangel, Silvio Lorusso, Angela Genusa, Jean Keller, Aaron Krach, Joachim Schmid, Benjamin Shaykin, Chantal Zakari, Richard Prince, David Horvitz and Penelope Umbrico. Over 240 works are in the collection. Library of the Printed Web continues to grow through curatorial acquisition and artist contributions.

The collection is used primarily for experimental publishing research, as a way to question issues of copyright, privacy and appropriation by artists on the internet, and as the basis for academic workshops in design and new media.

The project is frequently featured at book fairs, independent publishing conferences and schools, appearing at Miss Read Berlin Art Book Fair, Stadtbibliothek Stuttgart, Merz Akademie, Printed Matter's NY Art Book Fair, Offprint London, Theorizing the Web, Interrupt 3 at Brown University, The Internet Yami-Ichi, Printed Matter's LA Art Book Fair, Odds and Ends Art Book Fair at Yale Art Gallery, Rhode Island School of Design School of Visual Arts, International Center of Photography, School of the Museum of Fine Arts Boston and Offprint Paris. In 2013 Library of the Printed Web was featured at Theorizing the Web and The Book Affair at the opening of the 55th Venice Biennale.

Printed Web (publication) 
Printed Web is an artists' publication devoted to web-to-print art and discourse, published by Paul Soulellis / Library of the Printed Web. The project began in 2014 as a way to present new work by artists included in Soulellis’ Library of the Printed Web. Artists are invited to submit new or existing network-based work for the printed page. In the spirit of Seth Siegelaub, each issue is curated as a group exhibition for the printed page. Printed Web circulates primarily as print-on-demand publications, but also includes PDFs, ZIPs, GIFs, and server directories. More than 180 artists and writers have contributed to the project through issue #4. Individual issues are widely held in special artists’ publications collections and libraries, including Museum of Modern Art NY, Yale University, San Francisco Museum of Modern Art, Walker Center, and NY Public Library.

Printed Web 2 was included in the exhibition "Aerial Imagery in Print, 1860 to Today" at Museum of Modern Art, organized by MoMA Library, featuring a project by James Bridle. Printed Web 3 was an open call and launched on the front page of Rhizome and at Offprint London in May 2015, featuring work by 147 artists. Printed Web 4 was a co-publication with International Center of Photography and featured in the exhibition "Public, Private, Secret," curated by Charlotte Cotton in June 2016. The text "Folding the Web" by Michael Connor, artistic director of Rhizome, was included in Printed Web 4.

Printed Web 5: Bot Anthologia features algorithmic media: bots, feeds, streams, and other autonomous projects. It was presented at Eyebeam and Interrupt 4 at Brown University.

Artists included in Printed Web publications

Printed Web 1 (January 2014) 

 Joachim Schmid
 Penelope Umbrico
 Christian Bök
 Clement Valla
 Jason Huff
 Mimi Cabell
 Kenneth Goldsmith
 Hito Steyerl
 Benjamin Shaykin
 Christopher Alexander
 Mishka Henner
 David Horvitz
 Amperamp Press

Printed Web 2 (December 2014) 

 Constant Dullaart
 Daniel Temkin
 James Bridle
 John Zissovici
 Cheryl Sourkes
 Brian Droitcour
 Tan Lin
 Angela Genusa
 Webdriver Torso
 Rafaël Rozendaal
 Olia Lialina
 Cory Arcangel

Printed Web 3 (May 2015) 

 Open call: 147 artists (full list)
 Silvio Lorusso

Printed Web 4: Public, Private, Secret (June 2016) 

 Wolfgang Plöger
 Lorna Mills
 Molly Soda
 Travess Smalley
 Angela Genusa
 Eva and Franco Mattes
 Anouk Kruithof
 Elisabeth Tonnard
 Christopher Clary
 Michael Connor

Printed Web 5: Bot Anthologia (March 2017) 
Included 30+ artists who make bots, feeds, streams, and other autonomous projects.

Ian Cheng
Jason Ronallo
Anders Hoff
Brent Watanabe
John Emerson
Allison Parrish
Mario Klingemann
Colin Mitchell
Chris Novello 
Matthew Plummer-Fernandez and Julien Deswaef
John Cayley
Matthew Thomas 
Joana Moll
Darius Kazemi
David Lublin
Bob Poekert
Ash Wolf
Sean S. LeBlanc 
Eugenio Tisselli V.
Gregor Weichbrodt
Everest Pipkin & Loren Schmidt
Derek Arnold

References

Digital humanities
Artists' books
Art websites
Internet culture
Book collecting
Zines
Internet art
Publications